The 2017 Honduran Supercup was a match arranged by the Honduran Liga Nacional and the Honduran Cup which took place on 2 August 2017 between C.D. Marathón, winners of the 2017 Honduran Cup and F.C. Motagua, overall winners of the 2016–17 Liga Nacional season.  This was the first official edition of the Honduran Supercup and the 5th overall.

Qualified teams

Background
F.C. Motagua qualified as overall winners of the 2016–17 Honduran Liga Nacional after winning both the Apertura and Clausura tournaments.  This was the first appearance for Motagua since 1999.  Meanwhile, for C.D. Marathón, this was their first ever appearance in a Honduran Supercup.  They qualified as winners of the 2017 Honduran Cup where they defeated C.D. Gimnástico 3–0 in the final match.

The previous match between both sides ended with a 1–2 away victory to Motagua at Estadio Yankel Rosenthal on 12 April 2017 in a league encounter.

Match
In a rainy night, the game started at 19:10 CST.  The rules of the game allowed the teams to make a maximum of five substitutions.  After a 0–0 drawn in the first half, the goals came in the final minutes of the match.  With two goals from Erick Andino (67) and Félix Crisanto (77), F.C. Motagua harvested a comfortable advantage in the score.  However, Júnior Lacayo got in the score-sheet for C.D. Marathón seven minutes to regulation but were unable to level.  With the win, Motagua obtained the first official Honduran Supercup in history.

See also
 2017–18 Honduran Liga Nacional
 2018 Honduran Cup

References

Honduran Supercup
Supercup